Bohuslav Martinů's Piano Sonata, H. 350 was written in Nice in the last months of 1954 for Rudolf Serkin, who premiered it in Düsseldorf in 1957 coupled with Ludwig van Beethoven's Sonata No. 29. The first performance in the Eastern Bloc took place in Brno later that year, by Eliška Nováková.

It consists of three movements:

 Poco allegro 
 Moderato 
 Adagio - Poco allegro

See also 
List of compositions by Bohuslav Martinů

References

External links

Compositions by Bohuslav Martinů
1954 compositions
Martinu